Alen Akhrovich Avidzba (born 24 February 2000) is a Russian tennis player.

Career 
Avidzba has a career high ATP singles ranking of 380 achieved on 29 April 2019. He also has a career high ATP doubles ranking of 1098 achieved on 17 December 2018.

Avidzba made his ATP main draw debut at the 2019 Kremlin Cup after receiving a wildcard for the singles main draw.

References

External links

2000 births
Living people
Russian male tennis players
Sportspeople from Sochi
Russian people of Abkhazian descent